Mexico competed at the 1984 Summer Olympics in Los Angeles, United States. 99 competitors, 77 men and 22 women, took part in 87 events in 18 sports.

Medalists

Archery

In its second Olympic archery competition, Mexico entered one man and one woman.  Aurora Breton, a veteran of Mexico's first appearance in the 1972 archery competition, took ninth place.

Women's Individual Competition:
 Aurora Bretón — 2481 points (→ 9th place)

Men's Individual Competition:
 Adolfo González — 2418 points (→ 33rd place)

Athletics

Men's 5,000 metres 
 Gerardo Alcala
 Heat — 13:50.60
 Semifinals — 13:45.98 (→ did not advance)

 Eduardo Castro
 Heat — 13:51.46
 Semifinals — 13:42.04 (→ did not advance)

Men's 10,000 metres
 José Gómez
 Qualifying Heat — 28:28.50 (→ did not advance)

 Martín Pitayo
 Qualifying Heat — 28:59.19 (→ did not advance)

Men's Marathon
 Jesús Herrera — 2:20:33 (→ 36th place)
 Rodolfo Gómez — did not finish (→ no ranking)
 Miguel Angel Cruz — did not finish (→ no ranking)

Men's Javelin Throw
 Juan de la Garza
 Qualification — 79.16m (→ did not advance, 14th place)

Men's 20 km Walk
 Ernesto Canto
 Final — 1:23:13 (→  Gold Medal)

 Raúl González
 Final — 1:23:20 (→  Silver Medal)

 Marcelino Colín
 Final — 1:28:26 (→ 17th place)

Men's 50 km Walk
 Raúl González
 Final — 3:47:26 (→  Gold Medal)

 Ernesto Canto
 Final — 4:07:59 (→ 10th place)

 Martín Bermúdez
 Final — DSQ (→ no ranking)

Women's Marathon 
 María Trujillo
 Final — 2:38:50 (→ 25th place)

 Maria Cardenas
 Final — 2:51:03 (→ 40th place)

 Maria Luisa Ronquillo
 Final — 2:51:04 (→ 41st place)

Women's 400m Hurdles 
 Alma Vázquez
 Heat — 1:00.86 (→ did not advance)

Boxing

Men's Flyweight
Fausto García

Men's Bantamweight (54 kg)
 Héctor López →  Silver Medal
 First Round — Bye
 Second Round — Defeated Johnny Assadoma (INA), KO-3
 Third Round — Defeated Joe Orewa (NGR), 4:1
 Quarterfinals — Defeated Ndaba Dube (ZIM), 5:0
 Semifinals — Defeated Dale Walters (CAN), 5:0
 Final — Lost to Maurizio Stecca (ITA), 1:4

Men's Featherweight
Javier Camacho

Men's Lightweight
Luciano Solis

Men's Light-Welterweight
Octavio Robles

Men's Welterweight
Genaro Léon

Canoeing

Cycling

Eight cyclists represented Mexico in 1984.

Individual road race
 Raúl Alcalá — +1:43 (→ 11th place)
 Luis Ramos — +6:14 (→ 17th place)
 Salvador Rios — +22:20 (→ 47th place)
 Jesús Rios — did not finish (→ no ranking)

Team time trial
 Raúl Alcalá
 Félipe Enríquez
 Guillermo Gutiérrez
 Cuauthémoc Muñoz

Points race
 José Youshimatz
 Final — 29 points (→  Bronze Medal)

Diving

Men's 3m Springboard
Jorge Mondragón
 Preliminary Round — 537.03
 Final — 550.35 (→ 9th place)

Carlos Girón
 Preliminary Round — 549.75
 Final — 530.04 (→ 12th place)

Equestrianism

Fencing

One female fencer represented Mexico in 1984.

Women's foil
 Lourdes Lozano

Gymnastics

Judo

Modern pentathlon

Three male pentathletes represented Mexico in 1984.

Individual
 Ivar Sisniega
 Alejandro Yrizar
 Marcelo Hoyo

Team
 Ivar Sisniega
 Alejandro Yrizar
 Marcelo Hoyo

Rowing

Sailing

Shooting

Swimming

Men's 100m Freestyle 
Ramiro Estrada
 Heat — 52.07 (→ did not advance, 23rd place)

César Sánchez
 Heat — 54.94 (→ did not advance, 48th place)

Men's 200m Freestyle
César Sánchez
 Heat — 1:55.82 (→ did not advance, 31st place)

Carlos Romo
 Heat — 1:58.77 (→ did not advance, 42nd place)

Men's 100m Backstroke 
Ernesto Vela
 Heat — 1:01.42 (→ did not advance, 32nd place)

Men's 200m Backstroke 
Ernesto Vela
 Heat — 2:10.30 (→ did not advance, 26th place)

Men's 100m Breaststroke
Eduardo Morillo
 Heat — 1:06.82 (→ did not advance, 31st place)

Men's 200m Breaststroke
Eduardo Morillo
 Heat — 2:23.72 (→ did not advance, 20th place)

Men's 100m Butterfly
Carlos Romo
 Heat — 57.61 (→ did not advance, 32nd place)

Men's 200m Individual Medley
Eduardo Morillo
 Heat — 2:09.87 (→ did not advance, 23rd place)

Men's 4 × 100 m Freestyle Relay 
José Medina, Ramiro Estrada, César Sánchez, and Carlos Romo
 Heat — 3:33.86 (→ did not advance, 16th place)

Men's 4 × 100 m Medley Relay
Ernesto Vela, Eduardo Morillo, Carlos Romo, and Ramiro Estrada
 Heat — 3:56.11 (→ did not advance, 14th place)

Women's 100m Freestyle
Patricia Kohlmann
 Heat — 58.76 (→ did not advance, 20th place)

Teresa Rivera
 Heat — 59.61 (→ did not advance, 25th place)

Women's 200m Freestyle
Patricia Kohlmann
 Heat — 2:07.75 (→ did not advance, 21st place)

Irma Huerta
 Heat — 2:09.52 (→ did not advance, 24th place)

Women's 400m Freestyle 
Irma Huerta
 Heat — 4:25.13
 B-Final — 4:23.34 (→ 16th place)

Women's 800m Freestyle 
Irma Huerta
 Heat — 8:56.18 (→ did not advance, 12th place)

Rosa Fuentes
 Heat — DNS (→ did not advance, no ranking)

Women's 100m Backstroke
 Teresa Rivera
 Heat — 1:06.39 (→ did not advance, 21st place)

Women's 200m Backstroke
Teresa Rivera
 Heat — 2:22.94 (→ did not advance, 20th place)

Women's 4 × 100 m Freestyle Relay
Patricia Kohlmann, Teresa Rivera, Rosa Fuentes, and Irma Huerta
 Heat — 3:58.31 (→ did not advance)

Women's 4 × 100 m Medley Relay
Teresa Rivera, Sara Guido, Maria Urbina, and Patricia Kohlmann
 Heat — DSQ (→ did not advance)

Synchronized swimming

Women's Solo
Pilar Ramírez
Claudia Novelo
Lourdes Candini

Women's Duet
Claudia Novelo and Pilar Ramírez

Weightlifting

Wrestling

References

Nations at the 1984 Summer Olympics
1984
Olympics